Immigrants, Emigrants & Me is the debut album by Irish pop/rock band, Power of Dreams.  It was released in 1990 and included the singles '100 Ways To Kill A Love', 'Never Been To Texas' and 'Stay'.

Track listing 
All songs written by Craig Walker.  Published by CBS Music Publishing, Ltd.
 "The Joke's On Me"
 "Talk"
 "Does It Matter"
 "Much Too Much"
 "Had You Listened"
 "Stay"
 "Never Told You"
 "Bring You Down"
 "Never Been to Texas"
 "Where Is the Love?"
 "Maire, I Don't Love You"
 "100 Ways to Kill a Love"
 "Mother's Eyes"
 "Average Day"

Personnel

Power of Dreams
Craig Walker: Vocals, acoustic and electric guitars
Michael Lennox: Bass
Keith Walker: Drums

Additional Personnel
Robbie Callan: Additional acoustic and electric guitars

References

1990 debut albums
Power of Dreams albums
Polydor Records albums